Suillus pseudoalbivelatus is a species of bolete fungus in the family Suillaceae. Found in the Dominican Republic, it was described  as new to science in 2007.

References

External links

pseudoalbivelatus
Fungi described in 2007
Fungi of the Caribbean